Richard Glyn may refer to:

Sir Richard Glyn, 1st Baronet, of Ewell (1711–1773), British banker and MP
Sir Richard Glyn, 1st Baronet, of Gaunt's House (1755–1838), British banker and MP, son of the above
Sir Richard Glyn, 9th Baronet (1907–1980), British Conservative politician, descendant of the above
Richard Thomas Glyn (1831–1900), British Army general

See also
Richard Glynn Vivian (1835–1910), art collector and philanthropist
 Glyn baronets